Andrew L. Chaikin (born June 24, 1956) is an American author, speaker and science journalist. He lives in Vermont.

He is the author of A Man on the Moon, a detailed description of the Apollo missions to the Moon. This book formed the basis for From the Earth to the Moon, a 12-part HBO miniseries.

From 1999 to 2001, Chaikin served as executive editor for space and science at Space.com. From 2008 to 2011, he was a faculty member for Montana State University in Bozeman, Montana.  In 2013, he wrote and performed the narration on a NASA video re-creating the taking of the famous Earthrise photo during the Apollo 8 mission.

His book A Man on the Moon: One Giant Leap states that he grew up in Great Neck, New York, and, while studying geology at Brown University, worked at the NASA/Caltech Jet Propulsion Laboratory on the Viking program.

Bibliography

Cameo appearance
In the HBO miniseries From the Earth to the Moon, Chaikin made a brief appearance in pseudo-documentary footage in the first episode as the host of Meet the Press.

References

External links 
 
 
 Appearance on the Colbert Report, April 4, 2011

1956 births
Living people
Brown University alumni
Space advocates
People from Arlington, Massachusetts
20th-century American journalists
American male journalists